Pagan activism may refer to:
Reclaiming (Neopaganism)
Pagan Pride

Paganism
Religious activism